Pabanan (also Romanized as Pābanān) is a village in Karian Rural District, in the Central District of Minab County, Hormozgan Province, Iran. At the 2006 census, its population was 140, in 35 families.

References 

Populated places in Minab County